The 1980 Avon Championships of Seattle  was a women's tennis tournament played on indoor carpet courts at the Seattle Center Arena  in Seattle, Washington in the United States that was part of the 1980 Avon Championships Circuit. It was the fourth edition of the tournament and was held from January 28 through February 3, 1980. Second-seeded Tracy Austin won the singles title and earned $30,000 first-prize money.

Finals

Singles
 Tracy Austin defeated  Virginia Wade 6–2, 7–6(7–1)
 It was Austin's 2nd title of the year and the 12th of her career.

Doubles
 Rosie Casals /  Wendy Turnbull defeated  Virginia Wade /  Greer Stevens 6–4, 2–6, 7–5

Prize money

References

External links
 International Tennis Federation (ITF) tournament edition details

Avon Championships of Seattle
Virginia Slims of Seattle
Virginia Slims of Seattle
Virginia Slims of Seattle
Virginia Slims of Seattle
Tennis in Washington (state)